Binatama Bupolo Football Club (simply known as Binatama Bupolo) is an Indonesian football club based in Buru Regency, Maluku. They currently competes in Liga 3.

References

External links

Football clubs in Indonesia
Football clubs in Maluku (province)
Association football clubs established in 2020
2020 establishments in Indonesia